Earth Girls Are Easy is a 1988 American science fiction musical romantic comedy film that was produced by Tony Garnett, Duncan Henderson, and Terrence E. McNally and was directed by Julien Temple. The film stars Geena Davis, Julie Brown, Charles Rocket, Jeff Goldblum, Damon Wayans, and Jim Carrey. The plot is based on the song "Earth Girls Are Easy" from Brown's 1984 EP Goddess in Progress.

Plot
Three furry aliens—Mac, Zeebo, and Wiploc—from the planet Jhazalla are traveling in a spaceship. It has been a long time since they have had female companionship, and they receive a broadcast showing human females. They are titillated by these "hairless", shapely creatures, and when they discover that the broadcast came from Earth, they set off and land in Southern California.

In the San Fernando Valley, Valerie Gail works as a manicurist at the Curl Up & Dye salon. Dissatisfied with the lack of sexual interest from her fiancé, Dr. Ted Gallagher, she receives a makeover from her friend and the salon manager, Candy Pink. That night, Valerie sets out to seduce Ted, but instead, he arrives home with a nurse. Heartbroken and angry, Valerie kicks him out and destroys his belongings. The next day, she is sunbathing when the aliens' spaceship crash lands in her pool. She befriends them and calls her surf bum friend Woody to come over and drain the pool so the aliens can work on their ship and get it flying again. Meanwhile, she brings them into her home, and, despite an initial language barrier, the aliens prove to be quick learners and absorb American pop culture and language by watching television.

Ted tries to call Valerie and leaves a message informing her that he will return home later that night. Fearing Ted's reaction, Valerie takes Mac, Zeebo, and Wiploc to the salon. Although initially scared, Candy agrees to help the aliens blend into their surroundings. After having their fur shaved off, the aliens turn out to be human-looking and attractive. The group decides to go out and party at a local nightclub, where the aliens' looks, athleticism, and incredibly long tongues soon catch the eyes of every woman in the place. Valerie and Mac begin to fall for each other.

Ted arrives home and, finding Valerie missing, calls the police. She soon arrives with the aliens, claiming she won an MTV contest to spend the weekend with a rock band. Ted angrily demand that the aliens leave, but when two police officers arrive, Valerie tells them that Ted is attacking her guests. As the officers escort Ted away, he calls off the wedding. Despondent, Valerie retreats to her bedroom and Mac goes in to console her. They discover that they are anatomically compatible and have sex.

The next day, the pool is fully drained, and Zeebo and Wiploc are working on their ship when Woody stops by and offers to take them to the beach. They agree, and after accidentally holding up a convenience store, Zeebo and Wiploc are soon driving down a freeway the wrong way, in reverse, with the police in pursuit. Mac discovers his crew mates are in trouble and goes to help, but gets arrested along with Woody in a case of mistaken identity. Valerie smashes the police vehicle to get arrested, too, so she can go with Mac.

The police pursuit ends in a crash, and Zeebo and Wiploc are taken to the emergency room. There, they are examined by Ted, who discovers they have two hearts. While he is envisioning achieving fame and fortune from his discovery, Valerie and Mac elude the police and enter the emergency room disguised as a doctor and a nurse; they manage to convince Ted he is delusional. They then escape back to Valerie's house where work continues on the space ship. Meanwhile, Valerie and Ted reconcile and plan to elope to Las Vegas immediately.

Mac is heartbroken and prepares the ship for takeoff. Valerie goes to say goodbye to her alien friends, followed by Ted, who discovers the ship. While struggling to keep him from calling the authorities, Valerie comes to the realization that Mac is the one she truly loves. She boards the spaceship and they take off.

Cast

Production
After the release of Julie Brown's 1984 EP Goddess in Progress, Warner Bros. Pictures began writing a musical comedy based on the song "Earth Girls Are Easy", starring Brown. The film was to have a screenplay written by Brown, Terrence McNally, and Charlie Coffey. The film was originally slated to go into production in 1986, but the studio lost confidence in the project when director Julien Temple's previous film, Absolute Beginners (1986), proved to be a dismal box-office failure. The role of Valerie Gail was offered to some of the era's box-office draws such as Madonna and Molly Ringwald, but when they rejected it, Warner Bros. dropped the project. Several other studios expressed interest in producing the film, but none wanted Temple to direct. Ultimately, French bank Crédit Lyonnais agreed to finance the film with Temple at the helm (if $4 million was shaved off of the film's estimated $14 million budget) and the De Laurentiis Entertainment Group agreed to distribute it.

Principal photography was finally underway in late 1987 and Temple brought his own ideas to the project, including peppering the background with then-modern-sounding pop songs, featuring an homage to The Nutty Professor (1963), and using media personality Angelyne in a brief cameo (the director declared her "the patron Saint of Los Angeles"). However, Temple's studious eye for detail caused delays on the set, and according to producer Tony Garnett, "The first cut we had of the picture was a problem." The film underwent more than five months of post-production tinkering, including the removal of numerous scenes and the production number "I Like 'em Big and Stupid" (a different version of the song plays in the club scene; the deleted sequence appears on the DVD extras) and reshoots later commenced (the song "Cause I'm a Blonde" was injected into the film late in production), by which time the De Laurentiis Entertainment Group had filed for bankruptcy.

The finished print of the film had several very positive previews, which captured the interest of potential distributors Nelson Entertainment, New World, MGM/UA, Carolco Pictures, Lorimar Studios, and 20th Century Fox, but ultimately Vestron Pictures acquired the distribution rights. The film debuted at the Toronto Festival of Festivals in September 1988 and was slated to be released the following February, but legal entanglements delayed its release until May 1989.

Reception

Box office
Box office returns were low, with the film earning only a little more than a third of its $10 million production cost.

It grossed £172,880 in the United Kingdom.

Critical response
On the review aggregator website Rotten Tomatoes, the film holds an approval rating of 68% based on 37 reviews, with an average rating of 5.5/10. The website's critics consensus reads, "Earth Girls Are Easy is messy, silly, and not particularly bright – qualities it comes by honestly and deliberately." Metacritic, which uses a weighted average, assigned the film a score of 66 out of 100, based on 16 critics, indicating "generally favorable reviews".

Roger Ebert concluded, "Earth Girls Are Easy is silly and predictable and as permanent as a feather in the wind, but I had fun watching it." Leonard Maltin's Movie Guide called it an "[i]nfectiously goofy musical" and went on to cite "some good laughs" and "an endearing performance by Davis". George Anderson of the Pittsburgh Post-Gazette gushed over the absurdity of the story, and how fun the film was, saying it "is so cheerful about so many stupid things that you cannot, in good conscience, endorse it, but you may be tempted to adopt it." Chris Hicks of the Deseret News criticized the film for being "less a movie than a stretched-out, padded [music] video."

Accolades

Soundtrack
The accompanying soundtrack album was released on vinyl, cassette and CD by Sire Records on May 9, 1989. Most of the songs on the album are different mixes than were heard in the film, several songs from the film were omitted altogether and Geena Davis' song "The Ground You Walk On" was replaced with a rendition by Jill Jones.

Royalty's song "Baby Gonna Shake" was issued as a single (available in several formats with numerous remix variations) and Hall & Oates' rendition of "Love Train" was released as a single backed with the film's title song, performed by The N.

Legacy
The film served as inspiration for the music video for the 2015 song "Pretty Girls" by American singer Britney Spears and Australian rapper Iggy Azalea.

Stage show
Beginning on September 16, 2001, there were several staged reading/performances of a musical play version of the film. Based on the film's screenplay and written by Charlie Coffey and Michael Herrmann, Brown reprised her role as Candy, Kristin Chenoweth took over the role of Valerie, Marc Kudisch assumed the role of Ted and Hunter Foster was cast as Mac. Although costumes and props were utilized, there were no sets and the actors carried their scripts around the stage—these stagings were merely devised to find investors for the show.

The play did not feature any original songs; the performers sang renditions of 1980s pop songs along with several numbers from the film. The play followed the film's story and scenes pretty closely, but a lot of new dialogue was written, a few characters were omitted, and there were some other slight deviations. Audio and video recordings of the September 30, 2002, staging are circulating, and several video clips from this performance have surfaced on YouTube.

Despite positive reaction, the timing of the initial staging was bad (coming mere days after the September 11 attacks), and even after subsequent readings, the show never attained the investors needed to become a full-blown production.

Cast

 Kristin Chenoweth as Valerie Gail
 Julie Brown as Candy Pink
 Marc Kudisch as Dr. Ted Gallagher
 Hunter Foster as Mac
 Deven May as Wiploc
 Lisa Capps as Nurse/Ensemble
 Roxanne Barlow as Security Guard/Ensemble
 Steve Wilson as Security Guard/Ensemble

Musical numbers

Act I
 "(Shake That) Cosmic Thing" – The B-52's (heard on radio)
 "Earth Girls Are Easy" – The N (heard on radio)
 "Eternal Flame" – Valerie
 "Brand New Girl" – Candy, Valerie & Ensemble
 "(Let's Get) Physical" – Ted and Nurse
 "Heart of Glass" – Valerie
 "California Girls" (partial) – Mac and Wiploc
 "Funkytown" – Ensemble
 "I Like 'em Big and Stupid" – Candy

Act II
 "True Colors" – Mac
 "Atomic" – Valerie
 "Roam" – Entire Cast
 "Just Like Fred Astaire" – Mac & Valerie
 "'Cause I'm a Blonde" – Candy
 "Should Have Known Better" – Ted
 "Moonblind" – Mac and Valerie
 "Scary Kisses" – Valerie, Mac & Cast

References

External links

 
 
 
 Movie stills at Film.virtual-history.com

1988 films
1988 independent films
1988 romantic comedy films
1988 science fiction films
1980s American films
1980s English-language films
1980s musical comedy films
1980s romantic musical films
1980s science fiction comedy films
American independent films
American musical comedy films
American romantic comedy films
American romantic musical films
American science fiction comedy films
American science fiction romance films
De Laurentiis Entertainment Group films
Films about extraterrestrial life
Films based on songs
Films directed by Julien Temple
Films set in Los Angeles
Films set in the San Fernando Valley
Films shot in Los Angeles
Films with screenplays by Charlie Coffey (writer)
Films with screenplays by Julie Brown
Science fiction musical films
Vestron Pictures films